8-Pass Charlie was the nickname of Najeeb Ahmed Khan, a Pakistani bomber pilot who raided the Adampur Airbase in India a number of times during the Indo-Pakistani War of 1965, notably starting a series of airstrikes on the base by a solo raid.

He was named "8-Pass Charlie" by his impressed Indian adversaries at the Adampur base as he used to make eight passes, one for each bomb, on selected targets with improving efficiency instead of safely dropping all of his bomb load and exiting. He is also known to have had expertise in disguising his attack run by confusing anti-aircraft gunners by cutting throttles before entering a dive.

Early life and education 
Najeeb was born in Kaimganj to Israel Ahmed Khan of the Afridi tribe of Pashtuns, from the Khyber Pakhtunkhwa province of Pakistan, on 24 August 1933. He was the older brother of Jamal Ahmed Khan. 
Najeeb received his primary education from Muslim High School, Bombay and upon migrating to Pakistan in 1949, where he settled in Lahore and completed his higher education.

Career 
Najeeb joined the Pakistan Air Force's 17th GD(P) course at Pakistan Air Force Academy in Risalpur and graduated on 6 June 1954. He was then posted to the PAF's No. 2 Squadron for Fighter Conversion Course. His brilliant performance in the conversion course led him to be selected for Advanced Jet Conversion Courses in the United States.

On his return to Pakistan, he served in various PAF squadrons. He was amongst the few pilots who were selected to fly the newly inducted B-57 Canberra bombers. In 1962, he was again sent to the United States for more Advanced Training Courses and after returning, he was posted as the Officer commanding (OC) of the 31st Tactical Attack wing's elite No. 7 Squadron which was based at Mauripur Airbase. In 1969, he was appointed as the Base commander of PAF Base Malir and later commanded the PAF's No. 15 Squadron "Cobras". During his tenure with the Squadron, Najeeb also assisted Chuck Yeager on a flight to Mount Godwin Austin and took some memorable pictures of him in a PAF F-86F over the mountain. In 1974, he attended Joint Warfare Courses at the UK and also graduated from PAF Staff College. As his last deployment, Najeeb was appointed as Pakistan's Air Attaché in France until finally retiring from the PAF on 20 June 1981.

1965 War 

Najeeb was serving as the commander of the No. 7 Squadron during the Indo-Pakistani War of 1965. Throughout the war, Najeeb participated in 17 strike missions deep inside enemy territory.

B-57 raids

During the war, the bomber wing of the PAF was attacking the concentration of airfields in north India. In order to avoid enemy fighter-bombers, the B-57s operated from several different airbases, taking off and returning to different bases to hop and avoid being attacked. The B-57 bombers would arrive over their targets in a stream at intervals of about 15 minutes, which led to achieving a major disruption of the overall IAF effort.

1971 War 

During the 1971 war, Najeeb served as the PSO of PAF's Commander-in-chief, "Air Marshal Abdul Rahim Khan".

Named by adversaries
The name was assigned to this unknown pilot by his impressed Indian adversaries at the Adampur base, and appears to be derived from his daring routine of making eight passes in bombing runs during every air raid over the alerted airbase to bomb selected targets with each 500 lb bomb in the moonlight, "and tried to carry out an effective attack each time", instead of dropping his entire bomb-load of 4,000 lbs during the first pass which would have allowed a safer exit for the aggressor aircraft over initial defences.

Kills
One of 8-Pass Charlie's confirmed kills is an Indian Air Force MiG 21s on Operational Readiness Platform (ORP) which was about to take off when he executed the first raid on the Adampur airbase at 2200 hours with his lone B-57 on 6 September, 1965.

Technique

In addition to his routine of making eight passes over Adampur, Najeeb also seemed to have had a second routine of conducting his raids thirty minutes after moonrise.

Paddy Earle, an Indian fighter pilot, paid tribute to the PAF pilot by saying:

Sitara-e-Jurat citation 
For his inspiring leadership, courage and other actions displayed during the 1965 war, Najeeb was awarded the Sitara-e-Jurat, the third highest gallantry award of Pakistan.

His Sitara-e-Jurat citation read as follows:

Personal life 
Najeeb married Surraya on 14 October 1964 in London. The couple has a son named Babar (b. 1971). Soon after retiring from the PAF, he took residence in Canada and continues to live there with his family. Najeeb's younger brother, Air Chief Marshal Jamal Ahmed Khan, later went on to command the Pakistan Air Force. Both of them are the only brothers to be awarded the Sitara-e-Jurat.

See also
Sarfaraz Ahmed Rafiqui
Saiful Azam
Muhammad Mahmood Alam

References

Further reading
 

Bomber pilots
Indo-Pakistani War of 1965
Pakistan Air Force officers
Pakistani aviators
1933 births